, also known as just , is a fictional character and the main protagonist in the comedy manga series Yotsuba&!, as well as the one-shot manga "Try! Try! Try!", both by Kiyohiko Azuma. As the title character of the series and almost every chapter, Yotsuba is usually the focus of each episode; most stories revolve around her meeting, and often childishly misunderstanding, a new concept or activity indicated in the chapter title. She is noted for her childish energy, unusual naïveté, and iconic appearance.

Development 
 

Yotsuba first appeared in a one-shot manga published in 1998 and two webcomics called "Try! Try! Try!", where she appears very similar as she does in Yotsuba&!; for example, Yotsuba has the same personality and a very similar chibi design.

Appearance and personality 

She has a carefree and energetic personality, taking delight in simple matters even as she learns about all manner of things in her daily life. In Japanese, Yotsuba's dialogue is written without kanji, making it seem simpler and more childlike, and in a typeface that gives the impression of speaking with high intensity. Her energy is noted by other characters, especially members of the neighboring Ayase family. Her father says of her carefree nature, "She can find happiness in anything. Nothing in this world can get her down." However, when deeply frightened or upset, she does cry, and she has a fear of anything resembling a bullseye because it resembles an eye that "is staring at her".

At the start of the series, Yotsuba is shown as having very little knowledge of the world around her, even for a young child. Things such as swings, doorbells, cicadas, air conditioners, and recycling all fascinate and confuse her, although she is not perturbed by her ignorance. She occasionally mispronounces new words and creates neologisms, such as the name for her  a portmanteau of "Yotsuba's Box" that she uses to keep special things and her "scapbuk" (scrapbook). She often repeats, in incongruous ways, phrases spoken by adult characters around her without fully knowing the meaning, so she sometimes says vulgar words. A famous example of this is when Yotsuba learned the phrase "what the hell, man!” from her father's friend Takeshi Takeda, who Yostuba calls Jumbo. Yotsuba is able to slowly sound out writing in hiragana, and is praised for this by Jumbo, but she cannot correctly read a clock. She is frequently shown drawing, though she is not as good an artist as she thinks she is, and she is an excellent swimmer.

The series provides few details about her life before its start. She is an adopted child, with her birthplace unknown to the reader, although she claims she's from an island "to the left." Koiwai, Yotsuba's adopted father, says he met her as an orphan in a foreign country and before he knew it he was raising her as his own; she is sometimes taken for a foreigner by strangers. When asked about her mother, she doesn't understand the question, and she gets confused by the concept of having two sets of grandparents. Before moving to her current home, Yotsuba lived in the country with Koiwai and his mother. She initially claims she is six years old, but her father later corrects this, saying she is in fact five years old.

Yotsuba has never attended school, and as of the first chapter does not know what a grade is. In volume 6, chapter 35, she fails to understand repeated explanations of homework.

Reception 

The character of Yotsuba is cited by reviewers as one of the key appeals of Yotsuba&!, especially her energy, enthusiasm, and sense of wonder. For example, one wrote, "Yotsuba’s wide-eyed awe at each discovery, from the idea of a milkman to learning how to catch fish, is both inspiring and infectious. You want to see what happens next, because she continually comes across as genuine without turning into cloying." A reviewer at Anime News Network wrote, "What is really special about Yotsuba, though, is that newness with which she, as a child, sees the world. That the manga allows us to glimpse the world through those same eager eyes is what gives it appeal far beyond its humor." Johanna Draper Carlson, long-time comics reviewer for Publishers Weekly, said that "Yotsuba is a sponge of a character, with infinite possibility as she learns about life. Watching her do so is both fun and funny, and the way she finds enjoyment in everything is inspirational. It creates an infectious feeling of shared joy in the reader." Another claimed that "Yotsuba Koiwai's adventures are ... a lucid and charming look at the world through a child's eyes, as she gets into scrapes that remind us all of our own childhoods (if only through manga-tinted glasses)."

Reviewers often describe Azuma's depiction of her as realistic, especially compared to depictions of children in other manga and anime. One review claimed that "Yotsuba in particular is amusing, because she acts and speaks with that peculiar mix of honesty, immediacy, and childish logic that only young children seem to possess ... Yotsuba isn't a silent, simpering sweetie-pie, she acts like a real five-year-old." On the other hand, Tom Spurgeon claimed Yotsuba is "an idealized kid of that early age, retaining a wide-eye wonder and furious energy, minus the things that crop up at that age like cruelty and deception" and a reviewer in Newtype USA said that "Her hijinks are sweetly innocent, like a cuter, more naïve version of Dennis the Menace minus the 'menace'."

In other media 
The popular English-language imageboard 4chan, which is known in Japanese as "Yotsuba Channel", adopted Yotsuba Koiwai as an unofficial mascot: the site logo and icon at one point consisted of four leaves positioned identically to her distinctive four green pigtails, and she appears in the HTTP 404 message (leading to the nickname of "404 Girl"), banned user messages, banner ads, and logos. The software the site runs on is code-named Yotsuba.
In the Korean MMORPG MapleStory, Yotsuba's hairstyle can be obtained in a salon located in a town called Zipangu (an archaic name for Japan).
She appears on the ending part of the spin-off anime series Nyanbo!, based on the Danbo character that appears in two chapters of the Yotsuba&! manga.
In the anime series Eromanga Sensei, she is seen within the background alongside a Danbo.

References 

Adoptee characters in anime and manga
Child characters in anime and manga
Female characters in anime and manga
Fictional Japanese people in anime and manga
Orphan characters in anime and manga
Yotsuba&!
4chan